Shell Game is an American comedy-drama television series that aired on CBS from January 8 until February 12, 1987.

Premise
Two former con artists use their skills in a consumer-action show.

Cast
James Read as John Reid
Margot Kidder as Jennie Jerome
Chip Zien as Bert Luna
Marg Helgenberger as Natalie Thayer
Rod McCary as William Bauer
Fred McCarren as Vince Vanneman

Episodes

References

External links
 
TV Guide

1987 American television series debuts
1987 American television series endings
1980s American comedy-drama television series
English-language television shows
CBS original programming
Television series by Warner Bros. Television Studios
Television shows set in Los Angeles